Mycosphaerella gossypina is a plant pathogen.

See also
 List of Mycosphaerella species

References

gossypina
Fungal plant pathogens and diseases
Fungi described in 1883